The 1988 New Mexico Lobos football team was an American football team that represented the University of New Mexico in the Western Athletic Conference (WAC) during the 1988 NCAA Division I-A football season.  In their second season under head coach Mike Sheppard, the Lobos compiled a 2–10 record (1–7 against WAC opponents) and were outscored by a total of 518 to 170. 

The team's statistical leaders included Jeremy Leach with 1,986 passing yards, Andre Wooten with 801 rushing yards, Al Owens with 774 receiving yards, and kicker Rick Walsh with 46 points scored. 

In its third season of broadcasting both live and delayed games, KGSW-TV 14 (now KLUZ-TV) would only leave one road contest against Hawaii off its schedule.  As with the past two seasons, the road games were seen live, while the home games were show on delay at 10pm (MST).

Schedule

References

New Mexico
New Mexico Lobos football seasons
New Mexico Lobos football